Mtabozuko Nqam (born 11 July 1995) is a South African cricketer. He made his Twenty20 debut for Northern Cape in the 2018 Africa T20 Cup on 14 September 2018. He made his List A debut for Northern Cape in the 2018–19 CSA Provincial One-Day Challenge on 21 October 2018. He made his first-class debut for Northern Cape in the 2018–19 CSA 3-Day Provincial Cup on 1 November 2018. In September 2019, he was named in Eastern Province's squad for the 2019–20 CSA Provincial T20 Cup.

References

External links
 

1995 births
Living people
South African cricketers
Eastern Province cricketers
Northern Cape cricketers
Place of birth missing (living people)